Shreveport Municipal Memorial Auditorium is a historic performance and meeting venue at 705 Elvis Presley Boulevard in Shreveport, Louisiana.  It is an Art Deco building constructed between 1926 and 1929 during the administration of Mayor Lee Emmett Thomas as a memorial to the servicemen of World War I.  In 1991, the auditorium was listed on the National Register of Historic Places and on October 6, 2008, it was designated a National Historic Landmark.

Design
The building was designed by architects Samuel G. Wiener Sr., and Seymour Van Os, both of the firm of Jones, Roessle, Olschner & Wiener of Shreveport. Contractor for construction was the Ashton Glassell Company, also of Shreveport.

Stage of Stars Museum
The Municipal Memorial Auditorium houses the Stage of Stars Museum, and a 3,200-seat auditorium, which is used for concerts, family shows, Broadway plays, boxing, and other special events.  It is nationally significant, and was designated a National Historic Landmark, for hosting the Louisiana Hayride radio program, hosted by Frank Page (1925-2013). During its heyday, from 1948 to 1960, the program spawned the careers of some of the greatest names in American Country and Rockabilly music. The Hayride regularly featured performers, such as Hank Williams, Slim Whitman, Jim Reeves, Johnny Cash, Johnny Horton, and Elvis Presley, who got his start at this venue.

Renovations
The auditorium underwent renovations from 1994 through 2004.  Recent improvements to the auditorium have included air conditioning, renovated restrooms, installation of ramps and an elevator.

See also
List of concert halls
List of music venues
Theater in Louisiana
List of National Historic Landmarks in Louisiana
National Register of Historic Places listings in Caddo Parish, Louisiana

References

External links

Official website

Event venues on the National Register of Historic Places in Louisiana
Buildings and structures completed in 1929
National Historic Landmarks in Louisiana
Theatres on the National Register of Historic Places in Louisiana
Buildings and structures in Shreveport, Louisiana
Art Deco architecture in Louisiana
Boxing venues in Louisiana
Concert halls in Louisiana
Music venues in Louisiana
Performing arts centers in Louisiana
Sports venues in Shreveport, Louisiana
Tourist attractions in Shreveport, Louisiana
National Register of Historic Places in Caddo Parish, Louisiana
Individually listed contributing properties to historic districts on the National Register in Louisiana
1929 establishments in Louisiana